The Carters Limestone is a geologic formation in Tennessee. It preserves fossils dating back to the Ordovician period. The Carters contains abundant invertebrate fossils, including corals, stromatoporoids, brachiopods and bryozoans, mollusk (gastropods, bivalves and orthoconic cephalopods) and trilobites. Trace fossils also occur. The unit has several volcanic ash (bentonite) beds and is known to have isolated reef development.

See also 
 List of fossiliferous stratigraphic units in Tennessee
 Paleontology in Tennessee

References 

Ordovician geology of Tennessee
Ordovician southern paleotemperate deposits